The West Torrens District Football Association (WTDFA) was an Australian rules football competition based in the western suburbs of Adelaide, South Australia that initially ran from 1921 to 1926, folded, and then reformed for another 15 years from 1947. The association was first established following a meeting on 8 February 1921 involving the Kilkenny United, West Suburban, Croydon, Torrensides, Woodville and Underdale clubs along with the West Torrens Football Committee where it was decided to form an association.

First era (1921–1926)

Member clubs

Premierships

Second era (1947–1961)

Member clubs

Premierships

References 

1921 establishments in Australia
1961 disestablishments in Australia
Defunct Australian rules football competitions in South Australia